The Principles of International Commercial Contracts 2016 (most frequently referred to as UNIDROIT Principles and often also referred to as PICC) is a set of 211 rules for international contracts. They have been drawn up since 1984 by an international working group of the inter-governmental organization UNIDROIT, and they were ratified by its Council representing 64 governments of member states. 

As soft law, these principles help harmonize international commercial contract law by providing rules supplementing international instruments like the CISG and even national laws. Most importantly in private practice, they offer a neutral contractual regime which the parties can choose, either by incorporation into their contracts (in whole or in parts), or by a straightforward choice of the UNIDROIT Principles (e.g. “This contract is governed by the UNIDROIT Principles of International Commercial Contracts 2016”; in practice such a clause is often combined with an arbitration clause). 

The UNIDROIT Principles were first released in 1994, with enlarged editions published in 2004, 2010, and most recently in 2016 (including issues related to long-term contracts). Established with an international mind-set, they address many issues on which national legislators do not concentrate, such as foreign-currency set-off or hardship. Practitioners who use the principles describe them as a state-of-the art tool which is particularly useful when parties from different legal systems desire to agree on a neutral contractual regime. International law firm networks have an increasing number of committees concentrating on promoting the use of the UNIDROIT Principles in practice (e.g. the International Bar Association; Primerus Society of Law Firms).

Contents
Preamble
Chapter 1, General Provisions
Chapter 2, Formation and Authority of Agents
Chapter 3, Validity
Chapter 4, Interpretation
Chapter 5, Content and Third Party Rights
Chapter 6, Performance
Chapter 7, Non-Performance
Chapter 8, Set-off
Chapter 9, Assignment of rights, transfer of obligations, assignment of contracts
Chapter 10, Limitation periods
Chapter 11, Plurality of parties

See also
Australian contract law
Canadian contract law
English contract law
French contract law
German contract law
Principles of European Contract Law of 2003
Restatement (Second) of Contracts of 1979
UK commercial law
Unidroit
Uniform Commercial Code of 1952
US contract law

References

Brödermann, Eckart J., UNIDROIT Principles of International Commercial Contracts: An Article-by-Article Commentary. Nomos (Germany) and Wolters Kluwer (Netherlands), 433 p., 2018 (reviewed e.g. by in Singapore by Michael Patchett-Joyce https://lawgazette.com.sg/lifestyle/book-shelf/unidroit-principles/; in Brazil by Lauro Gama, RBA 2019, 222-225; in the UK by Klaus-Peter Berger, Arbitration International 2018, 1-3; in New Zealand by Petra Butler, (2018) 49 VUWLR 409-412).
S. Vogenauer and J. Kleinheisterkamp, Commentary on the UNIDROIT principles of international commercial contracts (PICC) (OUP 2009)
S. Vogenauer, Commentary on the UNIDROIT principles of international commercial contracts (PICC) (Oxford: OUP, 2nd edn 2015)

External links
 Unidroit's page for the PICC
 Unidroit Principles of International Commercial Contracts of 2016
 An Overview of the UNIDROIT Principles of International Commercial Contracts

Contract law
UNIDROIT